Arequena language may refer to:

Urequena language, an extinct language related to Andoque
Warekena language, an Arawakan language